The South Seas genre is a genre of literature, film, or entertainment (such as Tiki culture) that is set in the islands of the southern Pacific Ocean. Many Hollywood films were produced on studio backlots or on Santa Catalina Island. The first feature non documentary film made on location was Lost and Found on a South Sea Island, shot in Tahiti.

The genre was known for its portrayal of tropical men as savages and cannibals, and women as shapely, innocent, exotic beauties. The genre was seen as financially lucrative by the movie studios in the 1940s, despite criticisms that the genre was unrealistic and not well-informed. Typical examples include 1941's South of Tahiti and White Savage (1943).

Noted authors
 J. Allan Dunn: The Island of the Dead (1915), Beyond the Rim (1916), etc.
 Robert Dean Frisbie: The Book of Puka Puka (1929), etc.
 Jack London: Adventure (1911), South Sea Tales, etc.
 W. Somerset Maugham: The Moon and Sixpence (1919), "Rain," etc.
 Herman Melville: Typee (1846), Omoo (1847), etc.
 James A. Michener: Tales of the South Pacific (1947)
 Charles Nordhoff and James Norman Hall: Mutiny on the Bounty (1932)
 Frederick O'Brien: White Shadows in the South Seas (1919)
 Robert Louis Stevenson: In the South Seas (1896)
 Charles Warren Stoddard: South-Sea Idyls (1873), Summer Cruising in the South Seas (1874), etc.

Select films

References

Bibliography

 Langman, Larry Return to Paradise: A Guide to South Sea Island Films Scarecrow Press, 1998
 Reyes. Luis I. Made in Paradise: Hollywood's Films of Hawaii and the South Seas Mutual Publishing Company October 1, 1995
 Dixon, Chris & Brawley, Sean Hollywood's South Seas and the Pacific War Searching for Dorothy Lamour Palgrave Macmillan; July 25, 2012

External links
South Seas Cinema

Film genres
Film theory
Films set in Oceania
Oceanian culture